Let's Go Do What Happens is the fourth solo studio album of British musician Francis Dunnery, and his first release since his departure from Atlantic Records. The album was recorded in New York City for the Razor and Tie label. Though the songwriting has more in common with its predecessor Tall Blonde Helicopter, Let's Go Do What Happens returns to the more elaborate production style of Fearless, featuring plenty of keyboards and, at times, brass instruments.

Track listing
(All songs written by Francis Dunnery)
 "My Own Reality"
 "Sunflowers"
 "Perfect Shape"
 "Crazy is a Pitstop"
 "Jonah"
 "Riding on the Back"
 "I'95"
 "Crazy Little Heart of Mine"
 "Home in My Heart"
 "Whoever Brought Me Here"
 "Revolution"
 "Give Up Your Day Job"

Personnel
Lead Vocals, Guitars  - Francis Dunnery
Guitar - Gary Lucas
Bass - Jon Montagna
Drums- Graham Hawthorn
Keyboards - Doug Petty, Joe McGinty
Backing Vocals - Erin Moran, Ron Durbin, Stephen Harris, Jenny Goodwin
Gang Vox - Eddie Sayago, Jeremy Malman, Chris Rich
Preacher - Ron Durbin
Trumpet & Flugelhorn - Barry Danielian
Flute & Tenor Saxophone - David Mann
Trombone - Ozzy Melendez
Farfisa - Joe McGinty
Mixed by Bryce Goggin
Engineered by Roger Scheepers 
Produced by Francis Dunnery and Stephen Harris

References

https://web.archive.org/web/20100516182407/http://www.francisdunnery.com/Lets_Go_Do_CD.html

1998 albums
Francis Dunnery albums